The  Washington Redskins season was the franchise's 37th season in the National Football League (NFL) and their 32nd in Washington, D.C. The team finished 5-9, failing to improve on their 5-6-3 record from 1967.

Offseason

NFL Draft

Roster

Schedule

Season summary

Week 1

Week 5

Standings

References

Washington
Washington Redskins seasons
Washing